Ornarantia rimulalis is a moth in the family Choreutidae. It was described by Zeller in 1875. It is found on the West Indies.

References

Natural History Museum Lepidoptera generic names catalog

Choreutidae
Moths described in 1875